East Bengal is an Indian professional football club based in Kolkata, West Bengal, which competes in Indian Super League, the top tier of Indian football. The club was formed when the vice-president of Jorabagan, Suresh Chandra Chaudhuri, resigned when Jorabagan sent out their starting eleven but with the notable exclusion of defender Sailesh Bose who was dropped from the squad for reasons not disclosed when they were about to face Mohun Bagan in the Cooch Behar Cup semi-final on 28 July 1920. He along with Raja Manmatha Nath Chaudhuri, Ramesh Chandra Sen and Aurobinda Ghosh, formed East Bengal, in Jorabagan home of Suresh Chandra on 1 August 1920; 99 years ago. East Bengal started playing in the Calcutta Football League 2nd division from 1921 and in 1925 they qualified for the first division for the first time and since then they have won numerous titles in Indian Football.

East Bengal joined the National Football League since its inception in 1996 and is the only club to play all seasons till date, even after its name changed to I-League in 2007. East Bengal have won the National Football League thrice: 2000–01, 2002–03 and 2003–04, and became runners-up 7 times, the most of any Indian clubs. Among other trophies, East Bengal have won the Calcutta Football League 39 times, IFA Shield 29 times, Federation Cup 8 times and the Durand Cup 16 times.

History

On 28 July 1920, Mohun Bagan was scheduled to play Jorabagan in the Cooch Behar Cup. Jorabagan sent out their starting eleven but with the notable exclusion of defender Sailesh Bose who was dropped from the squad for reasons not disclosed. The vice-president of Jorabagan, Suresh Chandra Chaudhuri, asked for Bose to be included in the line-up but the club coaches did not listen. Chaudhuri left the club due to this and, along with Raja Manmatha Nath Chaudhuri, Ramesh Chandra Sen and Aurobinda Ghosh, formed East Bengal on 1 August 1920, named after the region they hailed from.

East Bengal Club played their first match in the 1920 Hercules Cup, which was a 7-a-side tournament that they won. After the tournament, the club became affiliated with the Indian Football Association. They won their first-ever full tournament in 1921, lifting the Khogendra Shield. The red and gold brigade qualified for the Calcutta Football League 1st division in 1925. They won their first 1st title in 1942. East Bengal won their first IFA Shield in 1943. In 1945, East Bengal won their first double of winning both Calcutta Football League and IFA Shield.

From 1949-51, East Bengal became the first team to make a hat-trick of wins in IFA Shield. In 1970, the club defeated Asian giants PAS Tehran to win the IFA Shield trophy. In 1972, East Bengal won Calcutta Football League, IFA Shield, Durand Cup and Rovers Cup in a single season, thus becoming the first team to do so. In 1972, East Bengal also made a record of being the first and till date only Indian team winning the Calcutta Football League without conceding a single goal, which they again repeated in 1991. In 1973, the club defeated Pyongyang City SC to lift the IFA Shield title and went on to defeat another North Korean team Dok Ro Gang to lift the DCM Trophy in the same season.

In 1975, East Bengal broke the record by winning the Calcutta Football League consecutively for the 6th time (1970–75), bettering the record held by Mohammedan Sporting of winning it 5 times (1934–38). In 1975, East Bengal also created history as they defeated their arch-rivals Mohun Bagan by a record margin of 5-0, which is still being held today, in the IFA Shield final at the Mohun Bagan Ground. In 1976, East Bengal made a record of winning the IFA Shield 5 times in a row. In 1978, East Bengal participated in the Federation Cup for the first time and became joint champions with Mohun Bagan.

In 1985, East Bengal won the Federation Cup and qualified for Asian Club Championships for the first time. East Bengal won the Coca-Cola Cup held in Colombo as a preliminary tournament for Central Asia Zone, and reached the group stages held in Jeddah, Saudi Arabia. In 1991 East Bengal qualified for the Asian Cup Winners' Cup for the first time and reached the quarter-finals.

In 1993, East Bengal won their second tournament on foreign soil as they won the Wai Wai Cup in Nepal. In 2000-01, East Bengal won their maiden NFL title, winning it again in 2002-03 and 2003-04. In 2003, they won a major international trophy at Jakarta when they defeated BEC Tero Sasana to lift the 2003 ASEAN Club Championship. The club won their third trophy outside of India when they defeated South Korean Hannam University to lift the San Miguel Cup in Nepal. Between 2007 and 2012, East Bengal won the Federation Cup 4 times (2007, 2009, 2010, 2012). From 2010-2017, East Bengal again bettered their own record as they won the Calcutta Football League for 8 consecutive times.

In 2020, the club joined the Indian Super League and rebranded as SC East Bengal. They finished ninth in their debut season, having won three of the twenty league matches. The team finished eleventh, at the bottom in the 2021–22 season, winning just one game in the entire campaign. In 2022, the club rebranded itself as East Bengal FC and finished ninth again, having won six of the twenty league matches.

Honours
East Bengal Club has won honours both domestically and in international competitions. They have won the National Football League title 3 times and the Federation Cup 8 times. They also won the Calcutta Football League a record 39 times and the IFA Shield a record 28 times. Till date, the club has won more than 175 trophies which are listed below:

 
  Shared record

Player records

Goalscoring records

 Most goals in all competitions: Bhaichung Bhutia, 148.

 Most goals in Indian Super League: Cleiton Silva, 12.

 Most goals in National Football League / I-League: Bhaichung Bhutia, 49.

 Most goals in Calcutta Football League: Somana, 85.

 Most goals in Federation Cup: Bhaichung Bhutia, 14.

 Most goals in IFA Shield: K. P. Dhanraj, 27.

 Most goals in Durand Cup: Mohammed Habib and Surajit Sengupta, 17.

 Most goals in Rovers Cup: Tulsidas Balaram, 10.

 Most goals in D.C.M. Trophy: Musa Ghazi, 12.

 Most goals in Continental competitions: Bhaichung Bhutia, 11.

 Most goals in a single Calcutta Football League campaign: Swami Nayar, 36 (During the 1946 season).

 Most goals in a single NFL / I-League campaign: Tolgay Ozbey and Chidi Edeh, 18 (During the 2011–12 and 2012–13 season respectively).

 Most goals in a single Indian Super League campaign: Cleiton Silva, 12 (During the 2022–23 season).

 Most goals in a single match: Fred Pugsley, 8 (against B.B & C.I. Railway, 23 September 1945, Rovers Cup).

 Most goals in a single match in NFL / I-League: Ranti Martins, 5 (against Dempo, 1 March 2015).

 Most goals in a single match in Continental competition: Biswajit Bhattacharya, 4 (against New Road Team, 2 August 1985, Coca-Cola Cup).

 Most goals in a single match against Foreign opponent: Bhaichung Bhutia, 6 (against Philippine Army FC, 16 July 2003, ASEAN Club Championship).

 Most hat-tricks in NFL / I-League: Ranti Martins, 3.

 Most hat-tricks in a single NFL / I-League campaign: Ranti Martins, 2 (During the 2015–16 season).

 Most hat-tricks in a single Calcutta Football League campaign: Swami Nayar, 4 (During the 1946 season).

 Fastest hat-trick: K. P. Dhanraj, 4 minutes 30 seconds, (against Maharana Club, 27 August 1949).

 Fastest hat-trick in NFL / I-League: Ranti Martins, 19 minutes, (against Aizawl, 12 March 2016).

 Most consecutive matches scored in NFL / I-League: Cristiano Júnior, 7 (During the 2003–04 season).

 Most consecutive matches scored in Indian Super League: Cleiton Silva, 3 (During the 2022–23 season).

Hat-trick on debut

Top goalscorers
Competitive, professional matches only.

All time top scorers

Top scorers in Indian Super League

Top scorers in National League/I-League

Top scorers in Calcutta League

Appearance records

 Most appearances in Indian Super League: Naorem Mahesh Singh, 37.

 Most appearances in I-League: Mehtab Hossain, 175.

 Most appearances in AFC Cup: Mehtab Hossain, 34.

 Youngest player to play for East Bengal in Indian Super League: Rohen Singh, 17 years and 301 days (against Chennaiyin FC, 26 December 2020).

 Youngest player to start for East Bengal in Indian Super League: Haobam Tomba Singh, 17 years and 306 days (against Kerala Blasters FC, 20 December 2020).

Most appearances in Indian Super League

The list of East Bengal players with the most number of appearances in the Indian Super League. Indian midfielder Naorem Mahesh Singh hold the record with 37 total appearances with 33 from the starting line-up for the club.

Player names in bold are part of the current squad.

Most Appearances in I-League

The list of East Bengal players with the most number of appearances in the I-League era, starting from 2007-08 I-League till 2019-20 I-League before the Red and Gold brigade moved into Indian Super League. Indian former International and former East Bengal captain Mehtab Hossain holds the record for the most appearances for the East Bengal having made 175 total appearances with 165 starts.

Player names in bold are still part of the current squad.

Most uninterrupted seasons played

East Bengal players at the Olympics

East Bengal club holds the record among Indian clubs to produce most players to have represented the national team in the Olympic Games.

Coaching records

Firsts
 First coach to be appointed professionally: Sushil Bhattacharya, 1961.

 First coach of foreign nationality: Philippe De Ridder, 2005.

 First coach to win the National Football League: Monoranjan Bhattacharya, 2000-01.

 First coach to win the Federation Cup: Arun Ghosh, 1978.

 First coach to win the Super Cup: Monoranjan Bhattacharya, 1997.

Records
 Longest serving coach: P. K. Bannerjee, 396 matches.

 Most matches won as head coach: P. K. Bannerjee, 292 matches.

 Most trophies won as head coach: P. K. Bannerjee, 31.

 Most trophies won in a single stint as head coach: P. K. Bannerjee, 16 (During 1972–76).

 Most NFL/I-League won as head coach: Subhash Bhowmick, 2.

 Most Federation cups won as head coach: P. K. Banerjee and Trevor James Morgan, 2.

 Most Calcutta League won as head coach: P. K. Banerjee, 7.

 Most international trophies won as head coach: Subhash Bhowmick, 2.

 Coaches who won the Triple Crown: P. K. Banerjee and Syed Nayeemuddin (in 1972–73 and 1990–91 respectively).

Managers at East Bengal since the start of National Football League

Foreign managers at East Bengal

Most successful managers at East Bengal

Most trophies won in a single stint

Club records

Matches

Firsts
 First match: East Bengal 4–0 Metropolitan College, 11 August 1920.

 First Calcutta League 2nd Div match: East Bengal 0–0 Sobhabazar Club, 2 May 1921.

 First Calcutta League 1st Div match: East Bengal 1–4 Calcutta FC, 9 May 1925.

 First win in Calcutta League 1st Div: East Bengal 2–1 Dalhousie, 25 May 1925.

 First IFA Shield match: East Bengal 1–1 Town Club, 20 July 1921.

 First Durand Cup match: East Bengal 2–0 Army Headquarters FC, 1926.

 First Rovers Cup match: East Bengal 6–0 Royal Navy, 6 September 1941.

 First Federation Cup match: East Bengal 5–0 Rajasthan Police, 22 April 1978.

 First NFL / I-League match: Mohammedan Sporting 1–2 East Bengal, 17 December 1996.

 First Indian Super League match: East Bengal 0–2 ATK Mohun Bagan, 27 November 2020.

 First win in Indian Super League match: East Bengal 3–1 Odisha, 3 January 2021.

 First competitive Continental match: East Bengal 7–0 New Road Team, 1 August 1985.

Wins

Defeats
 Worst defeat: Dynamo Kyiv 13–1 East Bengal, 6 September 1953.

 Worst defeat in Calcutta League: Dalhousie 7–1 East Bengal, 1928

 Worst defeat in Indian Super League: East Bengal 0–4 Hyderabad, 24 January 2022 (During the 2021–22 season).

 Worst defeat in NFL/I-League:
 Shillong Lajong 5–1 East Bengal, 30 May 2015 (During the 2014–15 season).
 Salgaocar 4–0 East Bengal, 29 December 2011 (During the 2011–12 season).

 Worst defeat in Continental competitions: Dalian Wanda 6–0 East Bengal, 19 September 1998 (During the 1998–99 Asian Club Championship).

Consecutive titles
 Most consecutive NFL/I-League titles: 2 (2002–03, 2003–04) shared record.

 Most consecutive Calcutta Football League titles: 8 (2010 to 2017) record.

 Most consecutive IFA Shield titles: 5 (1972 to 1976).

 Most consecutive Federation Cup titles: 2 (2009–10, 2010).

 Most consecutive Durand Cup titles: 3 (1989 to 1991) shared record.

 Most consecutive Rovers Cup titles: 2 (1973, 1974).

Undefeated/winning streaks
 Longest undefeated streak in all competitions: 57 matches, (47 wins, 10 draws). record.

 Longest undefeated streak in Calcutta Football League: 98 matches, (85 wins, 13 draws). record.

 Longest undefeated streak in Indian Super League: 7 matches, (2 wins, 5 draws).

 Longest undefeated streak in NFL / I-League: 22 matches, (17 wins, 5 draws). record.

 Longest undefeated streak in NFL / I-League in a single campaign: 17 matches, (13 wins, 4 draws).

 Longest winning streak in NFL / I-League: 6 matches (During the 2010-11 season).

 Undefeated Calcutta Football League Champions: 17 times, record.

 Calcutta Football League Champions winning all matches: 3 times, (1975–76, 1977–78, 2016–17) record.

Records in National Football League and I-League

Overall record in NFL/I-League

Record in ISL

Overall Record in ISL

Goals

Firsts
 First goal in Calcutta League 2nd division: Arabinda Ghosh (against St. Xavier's, 1921).

 First goal in Calcutta League 1st division: Mona Dutta (against Calcutta FC, May 1925).

 First goal in IFA Shield: Shashi Das (against Town Club, 1921).

 First goal in Durand Cup: Bhupen Das (against Army Headquarters, 1926).

 First goal in Rovers Cup: Sunil Ghosh (against Royal Navy, 1941).

 First goal in Federation Cup: Surajit Sengupta (against Rajasthan Police, 22 April 1978).

 First goal in NFL / I-League: Raman Vijayan (against Mohammedan Sporting, 17 December 1996).

 First goal in Indian Super League: Jacques Maghoma (against Hyderabad FC, 15 December 2020).

 First hat-trick by an East Bengal player: Jatin Sarkar (against Rangers, 1927 Calcutta Football League).

 First hat-trick by an East Bengal player in NFL/I-League: Ossius Luiz Ferreira (against State Bank of Travancore, 15 February 2000, during the 1999-00 season).

 First hat-trick by an East Bengal player in Federation Cup: Chima Okorie (against Assam Police, during the 1990 Federation Cup - Eastern Zone qualifiers).

 First hat-trick by an East Bengal player in IFA Shield: N. Mazumdar (against Victoria Sporting, during the 1936 IFA Shield First-Round).

 First hat-trick by an East Bengal player in Durand Cup: K. P. Dhanraj (against Kalighat, during the 1951 Durand Cup Quarter-Final).

 First hat-trick by an East Bengal player in Rovers Cup: A. C. Somana (against Royal Navy, during the 1941 Rovers Cup First-Round).

 First hat-trick by an East Bengal player in Asian Club Championship: Biswajit Bhattacharya (against New Road Team, 2 August 1985, during the 1985 season).

 First hat-trick by an East Bengal player in Asian Cup Winners' Cup: Carlton Chapman (against Al-Zawra, 1 October 1993, during the 1993-94 season).

 First hat-trick by an East Bengal player in AFC Cup: Ernest Jeremiah (against Nebitçi Balkanabat, 25 May 2005, during the 2005 season). 

 First golden-goal by an East Bengal player: Bhaichung Bhutia (against Mohammedan Sporting, 1993 Durand Cup Semi-Final).

Records
 Most goals scored in an Indian Super League season: 22 in 20 games (during the 2020–21 and 2022–23 season).

 Most goals scored in an NFL/I-League season: 46 in 26 games (during the 2011–12 season).

 Most goals scored in a Calcutta League season: 77 in 26 games (during the 1949–50 season).

 Fewest goals conceded in an Indian Super League season: 33 in 20 games (during the 2020–21 season).

 Fewest goals conceded in an NFL/I-League season: 9 in 22 games (during the 2000–01 season).

 Fewest goals conceded in a Calcutta Football League season: 0 in 19 and 18 games (During the 1972–73 and 1991–92 season).

 Fewest goals conceded in a Federation Cup campaign: 0 in 5 games (during the 2009–10 season).

 Most individual scorers in a single NFL/I-League match: 6 (against United Sikkim, during the 2012–13 season).

Top Scorers each season in ISL

Top scorers for East Bengal in each season:
* Current Season

Top Scorers each season in NFL/I-League

Top scorers for East Bengal in each season:

Hat-tricks in NFL/I-League
List of all hat-tricks for East Bengal in the NFL and I-League:

4 Scored 4 Goals 
5 Scored 5 Goals

Attendances
 Record highest attendance in a match: 1,31,785 (against Mohun Bagan in the 1997–98 Federarion Cup semifinal).

 Highest league home attendance in Indian Super League: 60,102 (against ATK Mohun Bagan in the 2022–23 season).

 Highest home attendance in Continental matches: 50,000 (against Al–Kuwait in the 2013 AFC Cup).

 Lowest league home attendance in Indian Super League: 1,982 (against NorthEast United in the 2022–23 season).

Kolkata Derby

Firsts 
 First Derby match: East Bengal 0–0 Mohun Bagan (8 August 1921, Cooch Behar Cup).

 First Derby win: East Bengal 2–1 Mohun Bagan (26 August 1921, Khogendra Shield Final).

 First Derby match in official tournament: East Bengal 1–0 Mohun Bagan (28 May 1925, Calcutta Football League).

 First Derby at Eden Gardens: East Bengal 2–1 Mohun Bagan (25 June 1967, Calcutta Football League).

 First Derby at Salt Lake Stadium: East Bengal 1–0 Mohun Bagan (28 September 1984, IFA Shield Final).

 First Derby at Kanchenjunga Stadium: East Bengal 0–0 Mohun Bagan (12 January 1988, Exhibition Match).

Goalscoring 

 First Goal in Derby: Nosa Sen (East Bengal 2–1 Mohun Bagan, 26 August 1921, Khogendra Shield Final).
 First Goal in Calcutta Football League Derby: Nepal Chakraborty (East Bengal 1–0 Mohun Bagan, 28 May 1925).
 First Goal in IFA Shield Derby: Vishweshwar Rao (East Bengal 1–0 Mohun Bagan, 8 August 1944).
 First Goal in NFL/I-league Derby: Felix Abayomi (East Bengal 1–2 Mohun Bagan, 6 January 1998).
 First Goal in Indian Super League Derby: Tiri  (ATK Mohun Bagan 3–1 East Bengal, 19 February 2021).
 Most Goals in Derby: Bhaichung Bhutia, 13.
 Most Goals in NFL / I-League Derby: Syed Rahim Nabi, 4.
 Most Goals in Federation Cup Derby: Bhaichung Bhutia, 5.
 Hattrick in Derby: Bhaichung Bhutia (East Bengal 4–1 Mohun Bagan, 13 July 1997, Fed Cup Semi Final).

Win Records 
 Biggest Victory: East Bengal 5–0 Mohun Bagan, 30 September 1975 (IFA Shield Final).

 Biggest Victory in Calcutta Football League Derby: 
 East Bengal 4–0 Mohun Bagan, 23 May 1936.
 East Bengal 4–0 Mohun Bagan, 6 September 2015.

 Biggest Victory in Durand Cup Derby: East Bengal 3–0 Mohun Bagan, 17 January 1979.

 Biggest Victory in Rovers Cup Derby: East Bengal 3–0 Mohun Bagan, 25 December 1969.

 Biggest Victory in Federation Cup Derby: East Bengal 4–1 Mohun Bagan, 13 July 1997.

 Biggest Victory in NFL/I-League Derby: East Bengal 3–0 Mohun Bagan, 22 February 2009.

 Most consecutive Derby won: 6 (from 12 January 1972, Durand Cup Final to 29 September 1974, IFA Shield Final).

 Most consecutive Derby won in NFL/I-League: 4 (from 8 December 2002 to 25 April 2004).

 Most consecutive Derby undefeated: 17 (1932 Days, from 25 December 1969, Rovers Cup Final to 29 September 1974, IFA Shield Final).

 Most consecutive Derby undefeated in NFL/I-League: 9 (from 8 December 2002 to 27 February 2007).

 Derby Doubles in NFL/I-League: 3 (During the 2002–03, 2003–04, 2018–19 seasons).

Overall Derby Record

Mini Kolkata Derby Record

East Bengal FC also has a minor rivalry against another giant from Kolkata Mohammedan SC. The rivalry started in the 1930s when Mohammedan SC won 5 consecutive Calcutta Football League titles between 1934-38 while East Bengal FC bettered their record in the 70s by winning the league for 6 consecutive seasons from 1970-75.

Goalscoring Records
 Highest margin of win:
 East Bengal FC 7–1 Mohammedan SC, 6 October 1998 (Calcutta Football League, Super Five).
 East Bengal FC 6–0 Mohammedan SC, 14 May 2012 (2011 Calcutta Football League).
 Highest margin of defeat: Mohammedan SC 3–0 East Bengal FC, 1940 (Calcutta Football League).
 Most goals in a single game against Mohammedan Sporting - Tolgay Ozbey, 4, 14 May 2012 (2011 Calcutta Football League).

Overall record

International

Continental record

Invitational tournaments
Apart from AFC tournaments, East Bengal club have participated in several invitational tournaments on foreign soil and have been victorious on three occasions.

Firsts 

 First match against foreign opponent: East Bengal 2–0 China Olympic XI, 14 July 1948 (Friendly Match, Kolkata).

 First competitive match against foreign opponent: Grazer 0–2 East Bengal, 6 August 1953 (1953 World Youth Festival, Bucharest).

 First win in a final at home: East Bengal 1–0 PAS Tehran, 25 September 1970 (IFA Shield, Kolkata).

 First win in a final away from home: Ranipokhari Corner Team 0–1 East Bengal, 15 June 1993 (Wai Wai Cup, Nepal).

 First match in Asian Club Championship: East Bengal 7–0 New Road Team, 1 August 1985 (During the 1985-86 season).

 First match in Asian Cup Winners' Cup: Abahani KC 0–0 East Bengal, 1 September 1991 (During the 1991-92 season).

 First match in AFC Cup: Geylang United 2–3 East Bengal, 10 February 2004 (During the 2004 season).

Records 

 Total Matches played in AFC competitions: 82.

 Matches played in Asian Club Championship: 9.

 Matches played in Asian Cup Winners' Cup: 55.

 Matches played in AFC Cup: 55.

 Most Appearances by a player in AFC Cup: 34, Mehtab Hossain.

 Most Goals against foreign opponents: 25, Bhaichung Bhutia.

 Most Goals in AFC competitions: 11, Bhaichung Bhutia.

 Most Goals in Asian Club Championship: 8, Debasish Roy.

 Most Goals in Asian Cup Winners' Cup: 8, Bhaichung Bhutia.

 Most Goals in AFC Cup: 6, Cristiano Júnior and Chidi Edeh (During the 2004 and 2013 season respectively).

 Most consecutive wins against foreign opponents: 8 Matches (2003–04)

 Most Goals by a player in a match against foreign opponents: 6, Bhaichung Bhutia (against Philippine Army, 2003 ASEAN Club Championship).

 Biggest win against foreign opponents: East Bengal 9–0 Club Valencia, 10 August 1985 (1985 Coca-Cola Cup).

 Biggest win in Asian Cup Winners' Cup: East Bengal 8–0 Tribhuvan Club, 15 August 1997 (during the 1997-98 season).

 Biggest win in AFC Cup: East Bengal 5–1 Yangon United, 15 May 2013 (during the 2013 season).

Notes

Bibliography
 Books

References

External links
 Official website

East Bengal Club related lists
Sport in West Bengal
Sport in Kolkata